Albertville High School is a four-year public high school in Albertville, Alabama. It has an enrollment of 1,665 students and is accredited by the Alabama Department of Education. In 2021, 48.7% of Albertville High School students were female, and 51.2% of students were male.
Albertville High School made AYP in 2007. 

In 2021, Albertville High School had 82 students for every full-time equivalent teacher.

In 2021, Albertville High School had 34.7% of students were eligible for free or reduced price lunch programs.

Albertville High School sports teams are known as the Albertville Aggies, for Albertville High School was originally an agricultural school.

Construction 
The Albertville School System recently completed its campus construction after years of work. Albertville High School was provided with a new lunchroom, building, Freshman Academy, Fine Arts building, gym, and football field.

Notable alumni
 John Hannah, Former (University of Alabama) player, Former NFL player (New England Patriots)
 Rusty Greer, Former MLB player (Texas Rangers)

References

Public high schools in Alabama
Schools in Marshall County, Alabama